Arkan Najeeb (born 2 July 1982) is an Iraqi former football forward who played for Iraq at the 2001 FIFA World Youth Championship.

Najeeb made 1 appearance for the national team in 2002.

References

Iraqi footballers
Iraq international footballers
Living people
Association football forwards
1982 births